The Sun Belt Conference softball tournament is the conference championship tournament in softball for the Sun Belt Conference. The winner of the tournament receives the conference's automatic bid to the NCAA Division I softball tournament. The 2023 host of the tournament is the University of Louisiana at Lafayette at Yvette Girouard Field at Lamson Park, the largest softball facility in the conference.

Tournament
The Sun Belt Conference softball tournament is an eight team double-elimination tournament held annually at various sites in the Sun Belt Conference region.  The bottom four seeds play a one-round single elimination play in game. The four teams with the best conference record at the end of the regular season earn automatic berths in the tournament. After the play-in round, the remaining six teams will play 2 four team double-elimination brackets with a single elimination championship game between the bracket winners. The team with the best conference record will be seeded #1 and will play the one of the winners of the first-round game. The team with the second-best conference record will receive the #2 seed  and will also play on the winners of the first-round game. The champion of the competition receives an automatic bid to the NCAA Division I softball tournament.

History
The tournament started in 2000 as a four team double-elimination tournament.

In 2001, the tournament expanded to include six teams but still remained double-elimination.

For the 2002 and 2003 edition, the tournament included five teams and remained double-elimination.

From 2004, the tournament went back to a six-team double-elimination format and stayed that way until 2007 when it expanded to eight-teams double-elimination and has stayed that way since.

The Ragin' Cajuns of Louisiana have considerably successful in the tournament, winning all but five times in the entirety of the tournament. Most winners of the tournament finished the season in the national Top-25 polls or received votes, except the 2007 Florida Atlantic team and the 2012 South Alabama team. The highest ranked of those teams was the 2008 Louisiana–Lafayette team to finish No. 6 in the NFCA poll. The lowest of those ranked teams was the 2002 Louisiana–Lafayette team who finished receiving votes.

Champions

By Year

By school
As of July 1, 2022, there are 12 schools in the conference that competes in softball, however, only three of the ten schools have softball championships.

Current members

Former members

External links

References